Fanny is the debut album by the American rock group Fanny, released in December 1970 on Reprise.

Background
In 1969, the rock band Wild Honey, featuring sisters Jean and June Millington, bass and guitar, respectively, and drummer Alice de Buhr, were spotted by producer Richard Perry's secretary. Perry arranged a trial session at Wally Heider Studios and concluded, "This is a band that needs to be recorded." The group added keyboardist and singer Nickey Barclay and began recording in early 1970, renaming themselves Fanny. The material included a cover of Cream's single "Badge".

The group were disappointed by Perry's production, feeling it didn't "bring out the best" in the group or reflect their live performances, though this would improve on later albums.

Release and reception
The album was released in December 1970. Robert Christgau gave the album an average review, though he said the cover of "Badge" was "a cute idea". A Canadian pressing of the album used the wrong master tapes, and consequently had a different track listing, including a cover of Maxine Brown's "One Step at a Time".

Real Gone Music re-released the album on CD in 2013. AllMusic's Stephen Thomas Erlewine wrote a favourable review, again singling out the cover of "Badge", and comparing the group's sound and arrangements to Badfinger.

Track listing

Personnel
Adapted from the album's liner notes.

Fanny
 June Millington – guitar, vocals
 Jean Millington – bass, vocals
 Nickey Barclay – piano, organ, vocals
 Alice de Buhr – drums, percussion, vocals
Technical
 Richard Perry – producer
 Roy Silver – associate producer
 Richard Moore – engineer
 Don Lewis – cover photography

References

1970 albums
Fanny (band) albums
Albums produced by Richard Perry
Reprise Records albums